Lunenburg is the primary village and a census-designated place (CDP) in the town of Lunenburg, Essex County, Vermont, United States. It was first listed as a CDP prior to the 2020 census.

The CDP is in southern Essex County, in the southeast part of the town of Lunenburg. U.S. Route 2 passes through the village center, leading west  to St. Johnsbury and east  to Lancaster, New Hampshire.

References 

Populated places in Essex County, Vermont
Census-designated places in Essex County, Vermont
Census-designated places in Vermont